is a 1983 arcade game developed and published for arcades by Nintendo. It was designed by Shigeru Miyamoto and Gunpei Yokoi, Nintendo's chief engineer. Italian twin brother plumbers Mario and Luigi exterminate creatures emerging from the sewers by knocking them upside-down and kicking them away. The Famicom/Nintendo Entertainment System version is the first game produced by Intelligent Systems. It is part of the Mario franchise, but originally began as a spin-off from the Donkey Kong series.

The arcade and Famicom/Nintendo Entertainment System versions were received positively by critics. Elements introduced in Mario Bros. such as spinning bonus coins, turtles which can be flipped onto their backs, and Luigi were carried over to Super Mario Bros. (1985) and became staples of the series.

An updated version of Mario Bros. is included as a mini game in all of the Super Mario Advance series and numerous other games. Mario Bros. has been re-released through Nintendo's online stores for later systems.

Gameplay 

Mario Bros. features two plumbers, Mario and Luigi, having to investigate the sewers of New York after strange creatures have been appearing down there. The objective of the game is to defeat all of the enemies in each phase. The mechanics of Mario Bros. involve only running and jumping. Unlike future Mario games, players cannot jump on enemies and squash them, unless they were already turned on their back. Each phase is a series of platforms with pipes at each corner of the screen, along with an object called a "POW" block in the center. Phases use wraparound, meaning that enemies and players that go off to one side will reappear on the opposite side. The game continues until the player loses all lives.

The player gains points by defeating multiple enemies consecutively and can participate in a bonus round to gain more points. Enemies are defeated by kicking them over once they have been flipped on their back. This is accomplished by hitting the platform the enemy is on directly beneath them. If the player allows too much time to pass after doing this (about six seconds), the enemy will flip itself back over, changing in color and increasing speed. Each phase has a certain number of enemies, with the final enemy immediately changing color and increasing to maximum speed. Hitting a flipped enemy from underneath causes it to right itself and start moving again, but it does not change speed or color.

There are four enemies which emerge from the pipes: the Shellcreeper; the Sidestepper, which requires two hits to flip over; the Fighter Fly, which moves by jumping and can only be flipped when it is touching a platform; and the Slipice which turns platforms into slippery ice. When bumped from below, the Slipice disappears immediately instead of flipping over and does not count toward the total number that must be defeated to complete a phase. All iced platforms return to normal at the start of each new phase.

A fifth enemy, fireballs, fly around the screen instead of sticking to platforms. They come in two variants, red and green. The green ones are faster, but disappear after a short period of time, while the red ones bounce about and don't disappear until they are hit from below. Later in the game, icicles form under the platforms and at times on the top of the pipes and fall loose.

The "POW" block flips all enemies touching a platform or the floor when a player hits it from below. It can be used three times before it disappears. Bonus rounds give the players a chance to score extra points by collecting coins within a time limit. The "POW" block fills itself at the start of each bonus round.

Development

Mario Bros. was created by Shigeru Miyamoto and Gunpei Yokoi, two of the lead developers for the video game Donkey Kong. In Donkey Kong, Mario dies if he falls too far. For Mario Bros., Yokoi suggested to Miyamoto that Mario should be able to fall from any height, which Miyamoto was not sure of, thinking that it would make it "not much of a game." He eventually agreed, thinking it would be okay for him to have some superhuman abilities. He designed a prototype that had Mario "jumping and bouncing around", which he was satisfied with. The element of combating enemies from below was introduced after Yokoi suggested it, observing that it would work since there were multiple floors. However, it proved to be too easy to eliminate enemies this way, which the developers fixed by requiring players to touch the enemies after they've been flipped to defeat them. This was also how they introduced the turtle as an enemy, which they conceived as an enemy that could only be hit from below. Because of Mario's appearance in Donkey Kong with overalls, a hat, and a thick moustache, Shigeru Miyamoto thought that he should be a plumber as opposed to a carpenter, and designed this game to reflect that. Another contributing factor was the game's setting: it was a large network of giant pipes, so they felt a change in occupation was necessary for him. The game's music was composed by Yukio Kaneoka.

A popular story of how Mario went from Jumpman to Mario is that an Italian-American landlord, Mario Segale, had barged in on Nintendo of America's staff to demand rent, and they decided to name Jumpman after him. Miyamoto also felt that the best setting for this game was New York because of its "labyrinthine subterranean network of sewage pipes." The pipes were inspired by several manga, which Miyamoto states feature waste grounds with pipes lying around. In this game, they were used in a way to allow the enemies to enter and exit the stage through them to avoid getting enemies piled up on the bottom of the stage. The green coloring of the pipes, which Nintendo late president Satoru Iwata called an uncommon color, came from Miyamoto having a limited color palette and wanting to keep things colorful. He added that green was the best because it worked well when two shades of it were combined.

Mario Bros. introduced Mario's brother, Luigi, who was created for the multiplayer mode by doing a palette swap of Mario. The two-player mode and several aspects of gameplay were inspired by Joust. To date, Mario Bros. has been released for more than a dozen platforms. The first movement from Mozart's Eine kleine Nachtmusik is used at the start of the game. This song has been used in later video games, including Dance Dance Revolution Mario Mix and Super Smash Bros. Brawl.

Release

The arcade game was released in 1983, but there are conflicting release dates. Game Machine magazine reported in 1983 that the game made its North American debut at the AMOA show during March 25–27 and entered mass-production in Japan on June 21. The book Arcade TV Game List (2006), authored by Masumi Akagi and published by the Amusement News Agency, lists the release dates as March 1983 in North America and June 1983 in Japan. Former Nintendo president Satoru Iwata stated in a 2013 Nintendo Direct presentation that the game first released in Japan on July 14, 1983.

Upon release, Mario Bros. was initially labeled as being the third game in the Donkey Kong series. For home video game conversions, Nintendo held the rights to the game in Japan, while licensing the overseas rights to Atari, Inc.

Ports and other versions

Mario Bros. was ported by other companies to the Atari 2600, Atari 5200, Atari 8-bit family, Atari 7800, Amstrad CPC, and ZX Spectrum. The Commodore 64 has two versions: an Atarisoft port which was not commercially released and a 1986 version by Ocean Software. The Atari 8-bit computer version by Sculptured Software is the only home port which includes the falling icicles. An Apple II version was never commercially released, but copies of it appear to exist.

A port by Nintendo for the Nintendo Entertainment System (NES) was released in North America on June 23, 1986. A later NES port was released exclusively in Europe in 1993, called Mario Bros. (Classic Series).

Mario Bros. was ported via the Virtual Console service in North America, Australia, Europe and Japan for the Wii, Nintendo 3DS, and Wii U. On September 27, 2017, Mario Bros. was released for the Nintendo Switch as part of the Arcade Archives series. The NES version was a launch title for Nintendo Switch Online.

Nintendo included Mario Bros. as a bonus in a number of releases, including Super Mario Bros. 3
and the Game Boy Advance's Super Mario Advance series as well as Mario & Luigi: Superstar Saga, The NES version is included as a piece of furniture in Animal Crossing for the GameCube, along with many other NES games, though this one requires the use of a Nintendo e-Reader and a North America-exclusive Animal Crossing e-Card.

In 2004, Namco released an arcade cabinet containing Donkey Kong, Donkey Kong Jr. and Mario Bros. Mario Bros. was altered for the vertical screen used by the other games, with the visible play area cropped on the sides.

Reception

Mario Bros. was initially a modest success in arcades, with an estimated 2,000 arcade cabinets sold in the United States by July 1983. It went on to be highly successful in American arcades. In Japan, Game Machine listed Mario Bros. on their July 15, 1983, issue as being the third most-successful new table arcade unit of the month. In the United States, Nintendo sold 3,800 Mario Bros. arcade cabinets. The arcade cabinets have since become mildly rare and hard to find. Despite being released during the video game crash of 1983, the arcade game (as well as the industry) was not affected. Video game author Dave Ellis considers it one of the more memorable classic games. To date in Japan, the Famicom version of Mario Bros. has sold more than 1.63 million copies, and the Famicom Mini re-release has sold more than 90,000 copies. The Nintendo Entertainment System (NES) version went on to sell  cartridges worldwide. The Atari 2600 version also sold  cartridges, making it one of the best-selling games of 1983. This brings total Atari 2600, NES and Famicom Mini cartridge sales to  units sold worldwide.

The NES and Atari versions of Mario Bros. received positive reviews from Computer and Video Games in 1989. They said the NES version is "incredibly good fun" especially in two-player mode, the Atari VCS version is "just as much fun" but with graphical restrictions, and the Atari 7800 version is slightly better.

The 2009 Virtual Console re-release of the NES version later received mixed reviews, but received positive reviews from gamers. In a review of the Virtual Console release, GameSpot criticized the NES version for being a poor port of the arcade version. GameSpot criticized it, saying that not only is it a port of an inferior version, but it retains all of the technical flaws found in this version. It also criticizes the Mario Bros. ports in general, saying that this is just one of many ports that have been made of it throughout Nintendo's history. IGN complimented the Virtual Console version's gameplay, even though it was critical of Nintendo's decision to release an "inferior" NES port on the Virtual Console. IGN also agreed on the issue of the number of ports. They said that since most people have Mario Bros. on one of the Super Mario Advance games, this version is not worth 500 Wii Points. The Nintendo e-Reader version of Mario Bros. was slightly more well received by IGN, who praised the gameplay, but criticized it for lack of multiplayer and for not being worth the purchase because of the Super Mario Advance versions.

The Super Mario Advance releases and Mario & Luigi: Superstar Saga all featured the same version of Mario Bros. (titled Mario Bros. Classic). The mode was first included in Super Mario Advance, and was praised for its simplicity and entertainment value. IGN called this mode fun in its review of Super Mario World: Super Mario Advance 2, but complained that it would have been nice if the developers had come up with a new game to replace it. Their review of Yoshi's Island: Super Mario Advance 3 criticizes it more so than in the review of Super Mario Advance 2 because Nintendo chose not to add multiplayer to any of the mini-games found in that game, sticking instead with an identical version of the Mario Bros. game found in previous versions. GameSpot's review of Super Mario Advance 4: Super Mario Bros. 3 calls it a throwaway feature that could have simply been gutted. Other reviewers were not as negative on the feature's use in later Super Mario Advance games. Despite its use being criticized in most Super Mario Advance games, a GameSpy review called the version found in Super Mario Advance 2 a blast to play in multi-player because it only requires at least two Game Boy Advances, one copy of the game, and a link cable.

Legacy

Related games

A version called  was released in Japan for the Family Computer Disk System, with added features and revisions to gameplay. It includes cutscenes and advertisements, being sponsored by the food company Nagatanien. It was only available as a Disk Writer promotion.

In 1984, Hudson Soft made two different games based on Mario Bros.  is a reimagining with new phases and gameplay.  includes a new gameplay mechanic: punching small balls to stun enemies. Both games were released for the NEC PC-8801, FM-7, and Sharp X1.

Mario Clash, released in 1995 for the Virtual Boy, was developed as a straight remake, with the working title Mario Bros. VB. It was the first stereoscopic 3D Mario game. Instead of bumping them from below, like in Mario Bros., the player must hit enemies using Shellcreeper shells.

Super Mario 3D World for the Wii U contains a version of Mario Bros. starring Luigi: Luigi Bros.

High score
On October 16, 2015, Steve Kleisath obtained the world record for the arcade version at 5,424,920 points verified by Twin Galaxies.

Notes 

Japanese titles

References

External links
 
Official Nintendo Famicom Mini Minisite 
Official Nintendo Wii Virtual Console Minisite 
Official Nintendo 3DS eshop Minisite 
Official Nintendo Wii U eshop Minisite 
Official Nintendo Wii Minisite 
Official Nintendo 3DS Minisite 
Official Nintendo Wii Minisite 
 (ZX Spectrum version)

1983 video games
Amstrad CPC games
Arcade video games
Atari 2600 games
Atari 5200 games
Atari 7800 games
Atari 8-bit family games
Atari games
Commodore 64 games
Cooperative video games
Famicom Disk System games
Fictional duos
FM-7 games
Game Boy Advance games
Hudson Soft games
Mario video games
Multiplayer and single-player video games
NEC PC-8001 games
NEC PC-8801 games
Nintendo arcade games
Nintendo Entertainment System games
Nintendo e-Reader games
Nintendo Research & Development 1 games
Nintendo Switch Online games
Nintendo Switch games
Platform games
PlayChoice-10 games
Sharp X1 games
Video games developed in Japan
Video games directed by Shigeru Miyamoto
Video games produced by Shigeru Miyamoto
Video games scored by Fred Gray
Video games set in New York City
Virtual Console games
Virtual Console games for Wii U
ZX Spectrum games
Hamster Corporation games
Video games with title protagonists